The 1978 FIBA European Championship for Cadettes was the second edition of the European basketball championship for U16 women's teams, today known as FIBA U16 Women's European Championship. 16 teams featured in the competition, held in Cuenca, Spain from 14 to 24 August 1978.

The Soviet Union won their second title in a row.

Participating teams

Preliminary round
In the PReliminary Round, the fifteen teams were allocated in two groups, one of eight teams and one of seven teams. The top two teams of each group qualified for the Semifinals. The third and fourth team of each group competed in the 5th-8th playoff. The fifth and sixth team of each group competed in the 9th-12th playoff. The seventh of each team competed in the 13th-14th playoff.

Group A

|

|}

Group B

|

|}

Playoffs

13th-14th playoff

9th-12th playoff

5th-8th playoff

Championship playoff

Final standings

External links
Official Site

FIBA U16 Women's European Championship
1978–79 in European women's basketball
1978–79 in Spanish basketball
International youth basketball competitions hosted by Spain
International women's basketball competitions hosted by Spain